The 35th Cuban National Series was dominated by Villa Clara, seeking to match Industriales' record of four straight titles from the early 1960s. However, the Leones were able to defend their record by upending the Naranjas in the final.

Standings

Group A

Group B

Group C

Group D

Playoffs

References

 (Note - text is printed in a white font on a white background, depending on browser used.)

Cuban National Series seasons
Base
Base
Cuba
Cuba